Gukjeong chumyo is an 18th-century Korean painting depicting a crouching cat under a wild chrysanthemum on an autumn day. It was drawn by Byeon Sang-byeok, who usually painted animals during the late period of the Korean Joseon Dynasty (1392–1910). Gukjeong chumyo literally means "An autumn cat in a garden with chrysanthemum" and is of the yeongmohwa, or animal painting, genre. It is painted on paper with light coloring over the ink and wash painting (sumukhwa). It is currently stored at Gansong Art Museum in Seoul, South Korea.

Byeon Sang-byeok is renowned for his skillful depictions of cats and chickens, so he was referred to by the nicknames "Byeon goyangi" (literally "Byeon cat") and "Byeon dak" (Byeon rooster) during his lifetime. His representative paintings include Myojakdo (Painting of Cats and Sparrows), and Hwajomyogudo (Painting of Flowers, Birds, and Puppies). The cat in the picture is crouching and gazing at something, and seems ready to swiftly run off.

See also
Shin Saimdang
Sim Sa-jeong
Bird-and-flower painting

References

External links
 동물그림에 사연을 담았네! at Hankyoreh 21

Korean painting
Joseon dynasty
Gansong Art Museum
Cats in art